Even As We Breathe is a 2020 American novel by Annette Saunooke Clapsaddle. The book is the first novel to be published by someone from the Eastern Band of Cherokee Indians.

Plot summary
During the summer in 1942, 19-year-old Cherokee Cowney Sequoyah thinks of leaving on his own to work as a groundskeeper at the Grove Park Inn and Resort in Asheville, North Carolina. However, he is worried about leaving his grandmother who took care of him after his parents died when he was an infant. Cowney also wants to leave his uncle, who makes fun of Cowney's disabled foot. Cowney decides to take the job when he discovers that his crush, Essie Stamper, is employed there. After taking the job, Cowney's coworkers treat him terribly for being Native American although Cowney does not let the abuse affect him. The people at the inn are held there for government surveillance as World War II continues. Despite being treated like guests, the people there are technically prisoners.

Release
Clapsaddle's first novel received positive reception and an award, but she had trouble finding a publisher. Even As We Breathe is the first novel to be published by someone from the Eastern Band of Cherokee Indians. Clapsaddle received assistance from the Great Smokies Writing Program to write the novel and it was published by the University Press of Kentucky on September 8, 2020. Clapsaddle said that she was not thinking at the time that it would be the first published novel from her tribe, and that it came to her attention after she signed the contract. Clapsaddle is also half Appalachia white.

Reception
Anjali Enjeti of The Atlanta Journal-Constitution said, "Some of the most groundbreaking novels set in Appalachia have been released in the last few years... Clapsaddle’s Even As We Breathe belongs in this astute group and evokes a similar theme." Mark I. Pinsky of New York Journal of Books wrote, "Asheville and the Grove Park Inn, which opened in 1913, are at the center of an engaging, debut novel, Even As We Breathe."

References

2020 American novels
Books by writers from peoples indigenous to the Americas
Eastern Band of Cherokee Indians
University Press of Kentucky books
Fiction set in 1942